Arnold Ralph Cooperman (16 November 1927 – 22 March 2009) was a British three-time Olympic foil and sabre fencer.

Personal life
Cooperman was born in Stoke Newington, England, and was Jewish.

Fencing career
He won the British junior championships in foil and sabre in 1950 and 1951, and was a three times British fencing champion, winning the sabre title at the British Fencing Championships in 1954, 1960 and 1961.

Cooperman was a medalist at the 1950 Maccabiah Games, the 1953 Maccabiah Games, and the 1969 Maccabiah Games. He competed in the world championships in 1953.    

He competed on behalf of Great Britain in foil and sabre at the 1956 in Melbourne, and in  Rome in the 1960 Summer Olympics and Tokyo in the 1964 Summer Olympics.    

He represented England and won a gold medal and two silver medals in the foil and sabre respectively at the 1954 British Empire and Commonwealth Games in Vancouver, Canada.

At the 1958 British Empire and Commonwealth Games won a gold and silver in the sabre events and four years later at the 1962 British Empire and Commonwealth Games he won triple gold and a bronze medal in the foil (behind teammate Allan Jay). He won his 11th medal in total and 6th and 7th gold medals in both sabre and team sabre at the 1966 British Empire and Commonwealth Games.

References

External links
 

1927 births
2009 deaths
British male fencers
Jewish male foil fencers
Jewish male sabre fencers
English Jews
Jewish British sportspeople
Olympic fencers of Great Britain
Fencers at the 1956 Summer Olympics
Fencers at the 1960 Summer Olympics
Fencers at the 1964 Summer Olympics
People from Stoke Newington
Maccabiah Games medalists in fencing
Maccabiah Games gold medalists for Great Britain
Maccabiah Games silver medalists for Great Britain
Commonwealth Games medallists in fencing
Commonwealth Games gold medallists for England
Commonwealth Games silver medallists for England
Commonwealth Games bronze medallists for England
Fencers at the 1954 British Empire and Commonwealth Games
Fencers at the 1958 British Empire and Commonwealth Games
Fencers at the 1962 British Empire and Commonwealth Games
Fencers at the 1966 British Empire and Commonwealth Games
Competitors at the 1950 Maccabiah Games
Competitors at the 1953 Maccabiah Games
Competitors at the 1969 Maccabiah Games
Medallists at the 1954 British Empire and Commonwealth Games
Medallists at the 1958 British Empire and Commonwealth Games
Medallists at the 1962 British Empire and Commonwealth Games
Medallists at the 1966 British Empire and Commonwealth Games